This is a list of unsuccessful or foiled attacks related to schools.

Foiled or exposed plots

See also 
 School bullying
 School shooting
 School violence

External links 
 School-Related Deaths, School Shootings, & School Violence Incidents: 2000–2001, National School Safety and Security Services
 School-Related Deaths, School Shootings, & School Violence Incidents: 2002–2003, National School Safety and Security Services
 School-Related Deaths, School Shootings, & School Violence Incidents: 2004–2005, National School Safety and Security Services
 School-Related Deaths, School Shootings, & School Violence Incidents: 2006–2007, National School Safety and Security Services
 School-Related Deaths, School Shootings, & School Violence Incidents: 2007–2008, National School Safety and Security Services
 School-Related Deaths, School Shootings, & School Violence Incidents: 2008–2009, National School Safety and Security Services
 School-Related Deaths, School Shootings, & School Violence Incidents: 2009–2010, National School Safety and Security Services

References

Notes

Failed terrorist attempts

Crime-related lists
unsuccessful